In molecular biology, mir-46 (MI0000017) and mir-47 (MI0000018) are microRNA expressed in C. elegans from related hairpin precursor sequences.  The predicted hairpin precursor sequences for Drosophila mir-281 (MI0000366, MI0000370) are also related and, hence, belong to this family.  The hairpin precursors (represented here) are predicted based on base pairing and cross-species conservation; their extents are not known.  In this case, the mature sequences are expressed from the 3' arms of the hairpin precursors.

References

External links 
 
 MI0000017
 MI0000018
 MI0000366
 MI0000370

MicroRNA
MicroRNA precursor families